The Tanoli (Hindko/) are a tribe living mostly in the Hazara area of Khyber Pakhtunkhwa, Pakistan. They form the majority of the population of Lassan Nawab union council. The Tanoli describe themselves as Barlas Turks. The Tanoli never submitted to the British colonial rule in the 1840s. They have two major divisions, namely Palaal (پل آل) and Hindaal (ہند آل). Majority of the Tanolis today speak Hindko language.

As per a Genetic Analysis of tribes residing in Buner and Swabi, through Dental Morphology and DNA Analysis, the most prevalent Y chromosomal haplogroup among the Tanoli is R1b1, with very small contribution of R1a1, a genetic characteristic unlike Ghilzai Pashtuns. LM20 and other South Asian lines are also present as well but to a little extent.

Notable Tanoli people
Mir Jehandad Khan Tanoli, was a tribal chief of the Tanoli people
Nawabzada Farid Salahuddin Tanoli, Pakistani politician
Sanjay Khan, Indian film actor, producer, director
Akbar Khan,  Indian film actor, screenwriter, producer and director
Feroz Khan, former Indian actor, film editor, producer and director
Fardeen Khan, former Indian film actor
Zayed Khan, Indian actor and producer

See also
Amb (princely state)

References

Social groups of Khyber Pakhtunkhwa
Ethnic groups in Pakistan